Saint-Amand Handball is the name of a French handball club from Saint-Amand-les-Eaux, France. This team currently competes in the French Women's Handball First League from 2020 and they play their home matches in Complexe Jean Verdavaine et Salle Maurice Hugot.

Team

Current squad
Squad for the 2021–22 season.

Goalkeepers
 16  Marie Heranval
 24  Manuella Dos Reis
 88  Petra Marinović
LW
 10  Romane Frécon-Demouge
 13  Iris Peltier
RW
 15  Chloé Pugliese
 19  Manon Pellerin
 23  Candice Maurin
Line players
 28  Noémie Barthelémy 
 97  Maëlys Kouaya

Back players
LB
 25  Clarisse Wild
 67  Laura Ingala
CB
 14  Clotilde Buzin
 18  Marion Malina
 21  Maëlle Chalmandrier
RB
 7  Vanessa Boutrouille
 22  Markéta Hurychova

Transfers
Transfers for the 2021–22 season

 Joining
  Emilie Bellec (RW) (from  Neptunes de Nantes)
  Emma Puleri (LP) (from  Mérignac Handball)
  Maja Vojnovic (GK) (from  Siófok KC)
  Typhanie Plee (GK) (from  Bouillargues Handball)
  Louison Boisorieux (LB) (from  HAC Handball)
  Joana Bolling (LW) (from  Aula Cultural)

 Leaving
  Manuella Dos Reis (GK) to Jeanne d'Arc Dijon Handball
  Petra Marinović (GK) to Brest Bretagne Handball
  Manon Pellerin (RW) to Toulon Métropole Var Handball
  Maëlys Kouaya (LP) to Plan-de-Cuques Handball
  Iris Peltier (LW) to HAC Handball
  Marion Malina (CB) (retires)

References

External links
 

French handball clubs
Handball clubs established in 1984
1984 establishments in France